Tylotiella is a genus of sea snails, marine gastropod mollusks in the family Drilliidae.

This genus has become a synonym of Clavus Montfort, 1810.

Species
Species within the genus Tylotiella include:
 Tylotiella decaryi (Dautzenberg, 1932)
 Tylotiella androyensis Bozzetti, 2007: synonym of Clavus androyensis (Bozzetti, 2007)
 Tylotiella basipunctata Kilburn, 1988: synonym of Clavus basipunctatus (Kilburn, 1988)
 Tylotiella biancae Bozzetti, 2008: synonym of Clavus biancae (Bozzetti, 2008)
 Tylotiella burnupi (Sowerby III, 1897): synonym of Clavus burnupi (G. B. Sowerby III, 1897)
 Tylotiella falcicosta (Barnard, 1958): synonym of Clavus falcicosta (Barnard, 1958)
 Tylotiella herberti Kilburn, 1988: synonym of Clavus herberti (Kilburn, 1988)
 Tylotiella heryi Bozzetti, 2007: synonym of Clavus heryi (Bozzetti, 2007)
 Tylotiella hottentota (Smith E. A., 1882): synonym of Clavus hottentotus (E. A. Smith, 1882)
 Tylotiella humilis (Smith E. A., 1879): synonym of Clavus humilis (E. A. Smith, 1879)
 Tylotiella isibopho Kilburn, 1988: synonym of Clavus isibopho (Kilburn, 1988)
 Tylotiella japonica (Lischke, 1869): synonym of Clavus japonicus (Lischke, 1869)
 Tylotiella malva Morassi, 1998: synonym of Clavus malva (Morassi, 1998)
 Tylotiella mediocris (Deshayes, 1863): synonym of Pleurotoma mediocris Deshayes, 1863 (nomen dubium)
 Tylotiella obliquata (Reeve, 1845): synonym of Clavus obliquatus (Reeve, 1845)
 Tylotiella papilio Kilburn, 1988: synonym of Clavus papilio (Kilburn, 1988)
 Tylotiella pica (Reeve, 1843): synonym of Clavus pica (Reeve, 1843)
 Tylotiella quadrata Kilburn, 1988: synonym of Clavus quadratus (Kilburn, 1988)
 Tylotiella rissoiniformis (Kay, 1979): synonym of Clavus rissoiniformis Kay, 1979
 Tylotiella roseofusca Bozzetti, 2007: synonym of Clavus roseofuscus (Bozzetti, 2007)
 Tylotiella subobliquata (Smith E. A., 1879): synonym of Clavus subobliquatus (E. A. Smith, 1879)
 Tylotiella sulekile Kilburn, 1988: synonym of Clavus sulekile (Kilburn, 1988)

References

 
Drilliidae
Gastropod genera